Kingsdown School is a mixed secondary school with academy status in Swindon, Wiltshire, England.  In its February 2020 Ofsted report, it was rated 'Good'.

In August 2019 the school was at the centre of a county lines investigation by Wiltshire Police, with 40 pupils suspected of being involved in the supply of cannabis and cocaine and girls as young as 14 being coerced into sexual activity in exchange for drugs.

References

External links
 

Secondary schools in Swindon
Academies in Swindon
Educational institutions established in 1932
1932 establishments in England